Viktor Igorevich Budyansky (or Romanization as Boudianski (born 12 January 1984) is a retired association footballer who played as a midfielder. He last played for Italian club Udinese.

Club career

Juventus and various loans
Budyanskiy started his Italy career at Juventus along with Ilyos Zeytulayev and Serhiy Kovalenko after a trail. He signed a five-year contract on 10 August 2001. He played his first league match for the club on 2 May 2004 against Perugia.

After graduation from youth team in June 2004, along with Ilyos Zeytulayev they were unable to register as a Juve player. At first FIGC declared that their remained two years contract did not fulfill the regulation and void them (FIGC declared that their contract was a youth contract and should be a maximum of three years) and a non-EU player at that time cannot sign a contract extension, thus they were released. But after an appeal, the appeal committee stated that a foreigner can sign a professional contract regardless his age, FIGC regulations only protected domestic youth product could only sign a contract for more than three years after 18, thus available to Juve since December.

he joined Reggina in a co-ownership deal for just €1000, along with Ilyos Zeytulayev in January 2005. In June 2005, Juventus bought back Budyanskiy for the same price (€500) and let Zeytulaev went to Reggina permanently.

In July 2005, Budyanskiy was loaned to Avellino of Serie B.

In July 2006, he was sold to Ascoli in another co-ownership deal for undisclosed fees. In June 2007, Ascoli bought the remain half for €900,000.

Udinese and various loans
In August 2007 he joined Udinese and in January 2008 left for Lecce. He played at Lecce for a year and joined Khimki in another one-year loan, along with team-mate Jani Tapani Virtanen, which also made Udinese had an extra non-EU registration quota.

In January 2010 he returned to Italy but failed to make a single appearance.

International career
Born in Ukraine, Budyanskiy has Russian citizenship and played a few matches for the Russia national team at a junior level and finally debuted for the senior team on 2 June 2007 as he came in as a substitute in the match against Andorra.

References

External links
 
 Profile at AIC.Football.it 
 Profile at La Gazzetta dello Sport 

1984 births
Living people
People from Vovchansk
Russian footballers
Russian expatriate footballers
Russia youth international footballers
Russia international footballers
Serie A players
Serie B players
Russian Premier League players
Juventus F.C. players
Reggina 1914 players
U.S. Avellino 1912 players
Ascoli Calcio 1898 F.C. players
Udinese Calcio players
U.S. Lecce players
FC Khimki players
Association football midfielders
Expatriate footballers in Italy
Russian people of Ukrainian descent